The Institute of Geosciences is a unit of instruction of the Federal University of Rio Grande do Sul (UFRGS). It includes the undergraduate courses of Geography, Geomatics Engineering, Geology. It has a department of study of vertebrate paleontology which has made great contributions to the geopark of Paleorrota.

The unit is also responsible for the maintenance of three museums, the Journal of Research in Geosciences, and post-graduate education and research.

Departaments 
The Institute of Geosciences is composed into five departments:
 Department of Geography
 Department of Geology
 Department of Mineralogy and Petrology
 Department of Paleontology and Stratigraphy
 Department of Geodesy

Undergraduate programs 
The Institute of Geosciences includes three undergraduate courses: Geography, Geomatics Engineering and Geology.

Graduate programs 
The Institute of Geosciences maintains two graduate programs: the Graduate Program in Geography (PPGEA) and in Geology (PPGEO).

Graduate Program in Geology 
The PPGEO includes four areas of focus: Stratigraphy, Marine Geology, Geochemistry and Paleontology. In total it has 275 enrolled students, of which 137 are PhD (Doctor of Philosophy) candidates and 138 Master' candidates. The program has already graduated more than 698 Master and 302 Doctors of philosophy.

Academics and faculty 
Both graduate programs (PPGEA and PPGEO) have achieved high standards (6 and 7 grades out of 7) according to the Brazilian Coordination of Improvement of Higher Level Personnel (CAPES).

Museum of Paleontology "Irajá Damiani Pinto"
Located in the Valley Campus, Avenida Bento Gonçalves in Porto Alegre, Brazil.

It is named after Irajá Damiani Pinto, professor at UFRGS.

The museum displays various fossils of the geopark of Paleorrota. In the same building, the Laboratory of Paleontology furthers the knowledge about the geopark, as many fossils are cleaned and prepared there.

See also

Paleorrota Geopark
 Porto Alegre Botanical Garden
 Museum of Science and Technology (PUCRS)
 Museum Education Gama D'Eça.
 Museum Vincente Pallotti.
 Museum Aristides Carlos Rodrigues.
 Museum Paleontologic and Archaeological Walter Ilha.
 Museum Daniel Cargnin.

Notes and references

External links
 Institute of Geosciences of UFRGS (Portuguese)
 Graduate Program in geology (PPGEO) https://www.ufrgs.br/ppggeo/ (Portuguese)

Geology museums in Brazil
Natural history museums in Brazil
Federal University of Rio Grande do Sul
Museums in Porto Alegre
Fossil museums